Yasemin is a 1988 German-language film.

Yasemin may also refer to:
Özlem Yasemin Taşkın (born 1985), Turkish former long-distance freestyle swimmer
Yasemin Adar (born 1991), Turkish freestyle wrestler
Yasemin Akat (born 1956) is a Turkish fashion designer
Yasemin Allen (born 1989),, English-Turkish actress
Yasemin Anagöz (born 1998), Turkish recurve archer
Yasemin Begüm Dalgalar (born 1988), Turkish basketball player
Yasemin Bradley, Turkish physician
Yasemin Can (born Vivian Jemutai on in 1996), Kenyan-Turkish long-distance runner
Yasemin Çegerek (born 1977), Dutch politician of Turkish descent
Yasemin Dalkılıç (born 1979), Turkish free diver
Yasemin Güler (born 1994), Turkish handballer
Yasemin Horasan (born 1983), Turkish professional basketball player
Yasemin Kimyacıoğlu, Turkish-American basketball player 
Yasemin Kozanoğlu (born 1978), Turkish actress and model
Yasemin Mori (born 1982), Turkish alternative rock singer
Yasemin Özata Çetinkaya (born 1976), Turkish civil servant
Yasemin Smit (born 1984), Dutch water polo player
Yasemin Şamdereli (born 1973), Turkish-German actress
Yasemin Şahin (born 1988), Turkish female handballer
Yasemin Taşkın, Turkish journalist and writer
Yasemin Ustalar, Turkish boxer